Qazi Abdul Sattar (born 8 February 1933 at Machreta - 29 October 2018 at New Delhi) was an Indian novelist and short story writer who wrote in Urdu.

He had penned several Urdu novels – mainly set in historical contexts – including Shab Gazida, Dara Shikoh, Salahuddin Ayyubi, Khalid Ibn-e-Waleed, and Ghalib.

Early life and education 
He was born in 1933 in Machreta near Sitapur. He completed his post graduation from Lucknow University. In 1954 he joined Aligarh Muslim University as a researcher. He served as a professor of Urdu in Aligarh Muslim University until his retirement in 1991.

Books 

Fiction

 Shikast ki Awaaz (also published as Pehli Aur Akhiri Kitaab)
 Shab-Ghazida (1966)
 Baadal
 Majju Bhaiya
 Gubaar-e-Shab
 Salahuddin Ayyubi (1968)
 Dara Shikoh (1968)
 Ghalib (1976)
 Hazrat Jaan
 Khalid Ibn-e-Waleed
 Tajam Sultan
 Aaen-e-Ayyam
 Peetal ka Ghanta

Critics

 Urdu Shaiyri Mein Qunutiat
 Jamaliyaat Aur Hindustani Jamaliyaat

Awards received

In 1974  he won the Padma Shri

References 

1933 births
2018 deaths
20th-century Indian novelists
20th-century Indian male writers
21st-century Indian novelists
21st-century Indian male writers
Indian novelists
Indian historical novelists
People from Aligarh
Recipients of the Padma Shri in literature & education
Urdu-language writers from India
Academic staff of Aligarh Muslim University